Le Scoot is a log flume ride at Busch Gardens Williamsburg located in the New France area.  It is themed after mountains and a saw mill.

Ride experience 
Once seated in the "logs", riders are taken up a conveyor belt lift hill. Part of the hill loops underneath of another part of the ride. At the top, the log takes a small drop and takes a sharp turn, intertwining with InvadR's lift hill. When passing by treetops, the chute the ride is in expands (although rails keep the log on-track) to give the illusion the log is in a pond. A small conveyor belt then brings the log up a few feet to avoid log collisions, and takes a steep, tall drop. Next, due to the backfiring currents of the previous drop, rapids form.  After passing more rails, the log takes a small turn and near a sawmill narrowly dodged by Alpengeist.  A safety recording is played in the sawmill, warning riders to "remain seated". Once in the sawmill, another small conveyor belt takes the logs up a few feet to, again, avoid collisions. The log then takes its largest, most notable plunge over a large pool of water.  A last, small hill drains excess water from the ride's chute and takes the logs on a sharp turn extremely close to Alpengeist's zero g roll. A pendulum is used on high-business days to separate logs into different waiting lines, and bring riders back to the boarding cabin.

See also
 Log flume (ride)
 Busch Gardens Williamsburg

Water rides
Log flume rides
Busch Gardens Williamsburg
Amusement rides introduced in 1975